The Baeksang Arts Award Grand Prize – Film is an award presented annually at the Baeksang Arts Awards ceremony organised by Ilgan Sports and JTBC Plus, affiliates of JoongAng Ilbo, usually in the second quarter of each year in Seoul. It is considered the highest honor in the Film division of the ceremony. Grand Prize for Film candidates are chosen from the list of nominees in the Film division each year and are not announced prior to the ceremony. Grand Prize winners, which could be either a movie or an individual, are ineligible for other major awards they are nominated for in the Film division.

Winners and nominees 

No prize (**) was awarded in 1982,1991,1997,1998. The other empty entries indicate that the prize was awarded to theatrical play (*).

References

Sources

External links 
  

Baeksang Arts Awards (film)